Fadel Al-Najjar (born April 2, 1985 in Kuwait City) is a Jordanian professional basketball player who currently plays for Al Ahli (Jordan) of the Jordanian Premier Basketball League "JPL". He plays in both the point guard and shooting guard positions.

Al-Najjar competed with the Jordanian team at the FIBA Asia Championship 2007 and FIBA Asia Championship 2009.  In 2009, Al-Sous helped the Jordanian team to a national best third-place finish by averaging 1.9 points per game off the bench for the team.

References

1985 births
Living people
Jordanian men's basketball players
Basketball players at the 2006 Asian Games
Basketball players at the 2010 Asian Games
Point guards
Basketball players at the 2014 Asian Games
Sportspeople from Kuwait City
2010 FIBA World Championship players
Asian Games competitors for Jordan
21st-century Jordanian people